is a railway station in the city of Ichinomiya, Aichi Prefecture, Japan, operated by Meitetsu.

Lines

Station layout
The station has one side platform, serving a single bi-directional track.  The station has automated ticket machines, Manaca automated turnstiles and is unattended.

Adjacent stations

|-
!colspan=5|Nagoya Railroad

Station history
Kannonji Station was opened on August 15, 1928. The station was closed in 1944 and reopened on July 22, 1950.

Passenger statistics
In fiscal 2013, the station was used by an average of 1567 passengers daily.

Surrounding area
former Yamato Town Hall
Yamato Junior High School

See also
 List of Railway Stations in Japan

References

External links

 Official web page 

Railway stations in Japan opened in 1928
Railway stations in Aichi Prefecture
Stations of Nagoya Railroad
Ichinomiya, Aichi